Govind Nagar is a southern neighbourhood of Kanpur named after Govind Vallabh Pant as he inaugurated this locality. It was the largest Vidhan Sabha constituency in Asia until Kidwai Nagar Vidhan Sabha constituency was formed.

It is surrounded by Fazalganj and Pratapganj in the north, Dada Nagar  in the west, Bakarganj and Kidwai Nagar in the east, barra, Juhi and Tulsi Vihar in the south.  It is large area comprising Halkawanda Colony, Param Purwa, Saket Nagar.

Govindpuri Railway Station is located in Govind Nagar and Jhakarkatti Bus station 4 km east.

Members of Assembly

Neighbourhoods in Kanpur
Shopping districts and streets in India